Kim Ryeong-hwa (born July 4, 1991), better known by her stage name Sleeq, is a South Korean rapper. She joined the hip hop record label Daze Alive in 2013, and has released two full-length albums: Colossus (2016) and Life Minus F is Lie (2018).

Discography

Studio albums

Mini albums

Filmography

Television

Awards and nominations

References 

1991 births
Living people
South Korean women rappers
South Korean feminists
South Korean LGBT rights activists